Bizerte Governorate is the northernmost of the 24 governorates of Tunisia. It is in northern Tunisia, approximately rectangular and having a long north coast. It covers an area of 3,750 km² including two large lakes, one coastal hence saline and one freshwater being the World Heritage Site, Ichkeul lake. Its population was 568,219 as at the 2014 census. The capital is Bizerte which stands principally on inlet between Bizerte lake and the Mediterranean. The offshore Galite Islands are part of the governorate, as are the ruins of the ancient city of Utica.

Geography 
The governorate is centered  from the capital and borders the governorates of Ariana, Béja, and Manouba.

The average temperature is 22.75 °C and annual rainfall is 300-800 millimeters.

Administrative divisions
Administratively, the governorate is divided into fourteen delegations (mutamadiyat), thirteen municipalities, seven rural councils, and 102 sectors (imadas). The delegations and their populations from the 2004 and 2014 censuses, are listed below:

The following thirteen municipalities are located in Bizerte Governorate:

References

 
Governorates of Tunisia